The Government of Russia exercises executive power in the Russian Federation. The members of the government are the prime minister, the deputy prime ministers, and the federal ministers. It has its legal basis in the Constitution of the Russian Federation and the federal constitutional law "On the Government of the Russian Federation". The Apparatus of the Government of Russia is a governmental body which administrates the activities of the government.

According to the 1991 amendment to the 1978 constitution, the President of Russia was the head of the executive branch and headed the Council of Ministers of Russia. According to the current 1993 constitution, the president is not a part of the government of Russia, which exercises executive power. However, the president appoints the prime minister.

History

The large body was preceded by Government of the Soviet Union. Since the Russian Federation emerged from 1991 to 1992, the government's structure has undergone several major changes. In the initial years, a large number of government bodies, primarily the different ministries, underwent massive reorganization as the old Soviet governing networks were adapted to the new state. Many reshuffles and renamings occurred.

On 28 November 1991, President of the RSFSR Boris Yeltsin signed presidential decree No.242 "On the reorganization of the government bodies of the RSFSR". Yeltsin officially declared the end of the Soviet Union and became the President of the Russian Federation. Yeltsin was a reformer and promised Western-styled democracy.

In 1993, the new Russian Constitution was adopted.  The new Constitution gained legitimacy through its bicameral legislature, an independent judiciary, the position of the president and the prime minister, and democratic features. These democratic features included competitive multi-party elections, separation of powers, federalism, and protection of civil liberties.

In 1999, Yeltsin appointed Vladimir Putin as the Prime Minister. Later in that year, Yeltsin resigned from the presidency and Putin took over as the Acting President. In a highly biased 2000 election, Putin won the presidential election.

The most recent change took place on 21 January 2020, when President Vladimir Putin signed a presidential decree on forming Mikhail Mishustin's Cabinet.

Responsibilities and power

The Government is the subject of the 6th chapter of the Constitution of the Russian Federation. According to the constitution, the government of the Russian Federation must:
Draft and submit the federal budget to the State Duma; ensure the implementation of the budget and report on its implementation to the State Duma;
Ensure the implementation of a uniform financial, credit and monetary policy in the Russian Federation ;
Ensure the implementation of a uniform state policy in the areas of culture, science, education, health protection, social security and ecology;
Manage federal property;
Adopt measures to ensure the country's defense, state security, and the implementation of the foreign policy of the Russian Federation;
Implement measures to ensure the rule of law, human rights and freedoms, the protection of property and public order, and crime control;
Exercise any other powers vested in it by the Constitution of the Russian Federation, federal laws and presidential decrees.

The government issues its acts in the way of decisions (Постановления) and orders (Распоряжения). These must not contradict the constitution, federal constitutional laws, federal laws, and Presidential decrees, and are signed by the Prime Minister.

The Government, also assists the Prime Minister, in faithfully carrying out the country's domestic and foreign policy as determined by the President, in general.

Current Cabinet

|}

Lists of ministers

See also
Security Council of Russia
List of heads of government of Russia
Government of the Russian Soviet Federative Socialist Republic
Government of the Soviet Union
Russian Foreign Services
Russia under Vladimir Putin

References

External links
Official website of the Government of Russia

 
Russia
History of Russia (1991–present)
European governments
Federal executive bodies of Russia